The Cincinnati Gymnasium and Athletic Club is a historic building in Cincinnati, Ohio, United States.  Located on Shillito Place in the city's downtown, it was built for a club of the same name.  Founded in 1853 by a group of Cincinnati elites, including Rutherford B. Hayes, the society chose to erect a new headquarters in 1902; at the time of its completion, this four-story building was hailed as one of the country's best athletic facilities, second only to the gymnasium at Columbia University in New York City.

A Second Renaissance Revival building designed by John Scudder Adkins of the firm Werner and Adkins, the building is built of brick with stone and metal elements.  Among these elements are rusticated stone courses, a molded balustrade, and trimmed windows.  In recognition of its distinctive and historically significant architecture, the club building was listed on the National Register of Historic Places in 1983.

References

External links
Club website

Sports venues completed in 1902
Athletics clubs in the United States
National Register of Historic Places in Cincinnati
Renaissance Revival architecture in Ohio
Sports venues in Cincinnati
Sports venues on the National Register of Historic Places in Ohio
1902 establishments in Ohio
Cincinnati Local Historic Landmarks